The discography of American rapper Young Dro consists of six studio albums, 21 mixtapes 3 compilation albums and 27 singles (including 17 as a featured artist).

Albums

Studio albums

Mixtapes

Compilation albums

Singles

As lead artist

As featured artist

Guest appearances

See also 
 Grand Hustle Records discography

References 

Discographies of American artists
Hip hop discographies